Karachi Parsi Institute (KPI), formerly known as Parsi Gymkhana, or Zoroastrian Club, is a tudor-style built gymkhana located in Saddar, Karachi, Pakistan. The complex comprises a recreational hall, swimming bath, pavilion, and sports facilities such as cricket ground and billiard room.

It is an exclusive club where only Parsi people are allowed.

History
It was founded in 1893.

As a cricket ground, it has hosted first-class cricket matches of various seasons.

See also
 Jahangir Park

References

1893 establishments in British India
Cricket grounds in Pakistan
Sports clubs in Pakistan
Saddar Town
Tudor architecture
Gentlemen's clubs in Pakistan
Tourist attractions in Karachi